Looney Tunes: Bugs Bunny 80th Anniversary Collection is a Blu-ray Disc box-set released by Warner Bros. Home Entertainment on December 1, 2020. It contains 60 Bugs Bunny shorts and numerous bonus features and supplementary content. The set's packaging includes a slip book, a booklet, and a collectible Bugs Bunny Funko! POP doll.

Initially conceived by Warner Bros. Home Entertainment as a single-disc Blu-ray Disc version of The Essential Bugs Bunny DVD set with an additional Funko! doll, animation historian Jerry Beck convinced the department heads to extend the set to three discs and include cartoons not previously released on DVD or Blu-ray Disc in order to appeal to adult collectors. The set includes 32 newly restored and remastered cartoons that were previously unavailable on the Looney Tunes Golden Collection DVD and Looney Tunes Platinum Collection Blu-ray Disc sets, in addition to 20 "essential" shorts ported over from those previous collections. Eight cartoons (Lumber Jack-Rabbit, Napoleon Bunny-Part, People Are Bunny, Person to Bunny, From Hare to Heir, The Million Hare and False Hare) had been previously restored and released on the Looney Tunes Super Stars DVDs, however, this Blu-ray Disc set presents them in their original 4:3 aspect ratio (as opposed to the Super Stars sets which had them cropped to "widescreen"). According to Beck, with this collection along with the previous Golden and Platinum Collections, Looney Tunes fans and collectors would be able to own approximately 90% of Bugs Bunny's filmography.

The set also marks the first official home media release of the HBO Max series Looney Tunes Cartoons, with 10 Bugs Bunny centric episodes included as bonus features.

Disc 1 
 LT=Looney Tunes
 MM=Merrie Melodies
 (*)= Newly Restored for Blu-ray

Special Features 
 NEW: Bugs Bunny's 80th What's Up, Doc-umentarary! (provided in HD)
 Behind the Tunes Featurettes Hare Ribbin Director's Cut (Uncensored & Unrestored)
 Bugs: A Rabbit for All Seasoinings
 Forever Befuddled
 Mars Attacks! Life on the Red Planet with My Favourite Martain (provided in HD)
 Audio Commentaries'''
 Jerry Beck on Elmer's Candid Camera, What's Cookin' Doc? and 8 Ball Bunny Greg Ford on A Wild Hare, Hold, the Lion, Please!, The Old Grey Hare, Bugs Bunny Rides Again and What's Up, Doc? Michael Barrier on Bugs Bunny Gets the Boid and Haredevil Hare Paul Dini on Super-Rabbit Stan Freberg on Bugs Bunny and the Three Bears Constantine Nasr on Hare Ribbin
 Eric Goldberg on Baseball Bugs Greg Ford and Michael Barrier on Hair-Raising Hare Disc 2 
 LT=Looney Tunes
 MM=Merrie Melodies
 (*)= Newly Restored for Blu-ray

 Special Features 
 Bugs Bunny/Looney Tunes All-Star 50th Anniversary
 Behind the Tunes Featurettes A-Hunting We Will Go: Chuck Jones' Wabbit Season Twilogy
 Bugs Bunny: Ain't He a Stinker
 Wagnerian Wabbit: The Making of "What's Opera Doc?"
 Audio Commentaries Eric Goldberg on Rabbit of Seville
 Greg Ford on Rabbit Every Monday and Rabbit Fire
 Constantine Nasr on The Fair-Haired Hare and Baby Buggy Bunny
 Jerry Beck on Lumber Jack-Rabbit
 Daniel Goldmark on What's Opera Doc?
 Chuck Jones, Maurice Noble and Michael Maltese (via archival recording) on What's Opera Doc?
 Alternate Audio Tracks Music Only Tracks for Baby Buggy Bunny, Rabbit Fire and What's Opera, Doc?
 Vocal Only Tracks for What's Opera, Doc?

 Disc 3 
 LT=Looney Tunes
 MM=Merrie Melodies
 (*)= Newly Restored for Blu-ray

 Special Features 
 Behind the Tunes Featurettes Hard Luck Duck
 Short Fuse Shootout: The Small Tale of Yosemite Sam
 50 Years of Bugs Bunny in 3½ Minutes
 Audio Commentaries Greg Ford on Show Biz Bugs, Rabbit's Feat, From Hare to Heir and (Blooper) Bunny
 Jerry Beck on Knighty Knight Bugs and False Hare
 Ten Looney Tunes Cartoons Episodes'''
 Harm Wrestling
 Big League Beast
 Pool Bunny
 Pest Coaster
 Buzzard School
 Siberian Sam
 Grilled Rabbit
 Vincent Van Fudd
 Hare Restoration
 Mini Elmer/Plunger/Moving Hole/Bees

Notes

References 

Looney Tunes home video releases